Grammatophyllum speciosum, also called giant orchid, tiger orchid, sugar cane orchid or queen of the orchids, is a species of orchid native to Laos, Myanmar, Thailand, Vietnam, Borneo, Indonesia (Sumatra, Java, Sulawesi) and Malaysia. It has also been recorded in the Philippines, New Guinea and the Solomon Islands.

Description 
It is an epiphytic and occasionally a lithophytic plant, forming spectacular root bundles. Its cylindric pseudobulbs can grow to a length of 2.5 m. It can grow to gigantic clusters weighing from several hundred kilograms to more than one ton. One collected in 1893 by Frederick K. Sander & Co. near Penang Island in Malaysia weighed a long ton (=a metric ton). Half was sent to the Columbian Exhibition in Chicago and the other half to the Singapore Botanic Garden. By 1902, the Singapore specimen had grown to be  in girth by ten feet (three meters) high and bore simultaneously 2090 five-inch-wide flowers plus 1110 unopened buds. The oldest individual orchid plant is also a G. speciosum. Planted in the Singapore Botanic Garden in 1861 by Garden Director Lawrence Niven and his staff, it was 154 years old in 2015. and so would now (2022) be 161 years of age. The plant is also  in width.

Each raceme can grow to a height of 3m, bearing up to eighty flowers, each 10 cm wide. The flowers are yellow colored with maroon or dark red spots. These flowers are remarkable, since the lowest flowers have no lip and these flowers function as osmophores for the entire inflorescence and continue to emit chemical scent to attract pollinators as flowers open in succession. It blooms only once every two to four years. This orchid can, however, remain in bloom for up to two months. Each individual flower can remain fresh for as long as six weeks. In addition, this plant has been found to have potential medicinal benefits; for example one research article by Harikarnpakdee and Chowjarean found it specifically aided in wound healing in humans.

Common names 

Giant orchid, not to be confused with Orthochilus ecristatus (Fernald) Rolfe or  Barlia robertiana, both of which are also commonly called the giant orchid.
Tiger orchid, not to be confused with Rossioglossum grande or Maxillaria species, both are also called tiger orchid.
Queen of the orchids, not to be confused with Cattleya species
Sugar cane orchid, for its resemblance to a sugarcane plant of the genus Saccharum

Distribution and habitat 
It is native to New Guinea, Thailand, Indonesia, Malaysia and Philippines, growing in crotches of large trees on exposed areas of the lowland tropical rainforest.

Ecology 
A giant orchid weighing two tons was one of the highlights in the 1851 exhibition at the Crystal Palace in London.

Because of its enormous size, it is rarely cultivated as this species is usually too large to be accommodated in most greenhouses. Cultivated specimens of this species are always grown as terrestrials, as the plants grow as both an epiphyte and terrestrial in habitat.

References

External links 

speciosum
Flora of Indo-China
Flora of Malesia
Epiphytic orchids